Gelmi is an Italian surname. Notable people with the surname include:

 Ludovico Gelmi (born 2001), Italian footballer
 Roy Gelmi (born 1995), Swiss footballer

Italian-language surnames